John Alan Wright (19 May 1929 – 12 July 2001) was a British amateur boxer who won a silver medal in the 1948 Summer Olympics in London. He lost in the final to László Papp of Hungary. He was born in London and fought as Johnny Wright.

Biography
Wright won the 1948 Amateur Boxing Association British middleweight title, when boxing for the Royal Navy.

1948 Olympic results
Below are the results of Johnny Wright of Great Britain, a middleweight boxer who competed at the 1948 Olympic Games in London.

 Round of 32: defeated Herman Schneider (Switzerland) on points
 Round of 16: defeated Hector Garcia (Argentina) referee stopped contest in second round
 Quarterfinal: defeated Jan Schubart (Netherlands) on points
 Semifinal: defeated Mick McKeon (Ireland) on points
 Final: lost to László Papp (Hungary) on points (was awarded the silver medal)

References

External links
profile

1929 births
2001 deaths
Boxers from Greater London
Middleweight boxers
Olympic boxers of Great Britain
Boxers at the 1948 Summer Olympics
Olympic silver medallists for Great Britain
England Boxing champions
Olympic medalists in boxing
British male boxers
Medalists at the 1948 Summer Olympics